Altaesajania is a genus of trilobites in the order Phacopida, which existed in what is now southern Siberia, Russia. It was described by Maksimova in 1978, and the type species is Altaesajania primitiva, originally described as a species of Phacopidella by Maksimova in 1960.

References

External links
 Altaesajania at the Paleobiology Database

Fossils of Russia
Phacopida genera